Vimbai Mutinhiri (born 18 February 1987) is a Zimbabwean actress, model and television personality. She was born in Harare, Zimbabwe but raised in Belgrade, Serbia and in Johannesburg, South Africa. Prior to participating in Big Brother Africa Amplified in 2011, she studied in South Africa graduating from the University of Cape Town with an honours degree in politics, philosophy and economics.

Background 
Vimbai is the youngest of four children of Ambrose Mutinhiri and Tracy Mutinhiri, both of whom are Zimbabwean cabinet ministers.

She attended at St Edward's School, Oxford and Arundel School in Harare, graduating in 2000 and 2002 respectively. She then studied Social Sciences at the University of Cape Town, graduating in 2008 with a bachelor's degree.

Career 
Vimbai started her career at the age of 15 years as an actress in Zimbabwe, in a short film titled “Who’s In Charge”, with the movie featuring at the Zimbabwe International Film Festival. She went on to play a lead role in Zimbabwe's first soap opera titled “Studio 263”. While studying at the University of Cape Town, she continued modeling.

In 2011, Vimbai took part in Big Brother Africa season 6 (Amplified).

She has gone on to host major African events, notably the first ever Africa Magic Viewers Choice Awards broadcast live to 54 countries from Lagos, Nigeria.

Currently the Face of Castle Milk Stout (Cameroon), she has also been on the runway at the SA Fashion Week and the Zimbabwe Fashion Week.

Marriage 
Vimbai recently had her court wedding to her Nigerian lover, Andrew Ekpenyong in Calabar, Cross River State.

Big Brother Amplified 
Vimbai was the 16th housemate to be evicted, on Day 84.

Star Gist 
After Big Brother, she was chosen as the new presenter for the entertainment and lifestyle show, “Star Gist” on Africa Magic Entertainment. Vimbai co-hosts the show, which is aired across Africa, with 22-year-old South African, Lawrence Maleka.

Style 
In an interview with Nigerian daily, Punch  she said "I love structured, well-fitting dresses. Also, well-tailored clothing. I have always loved colours especially on dark skin."

References

External links
 Official profile on Big Brother website

1987 births
Living people
Big Brother (franchise) contestants
People educated at St Edward's School, Oxford
Alumni of Arundel School
University of Cape Town alumni